Emma Jane Pierson (born 30 April 1981) is an English actress.  Her appearances in television programmes include the role of Anna Thornton-Wilton in the BBC television drama Hotel Babylon, and SunTrap, Days Like These, Beast, I Saw You, Charles II: The Power and The Passion, The Worst Week of My Life, Bloodlines, Coupling, Time Gentlemen Please, Dead Boss and Killing Eve. 

Early life and education
The daughter of a nurse and a Royal Navy submariner, Pierson was born Emma Jane Pierson on 30 April 1981 in Plymouth, Devon. Her father, Charles, was stationed at Faslane Naval Base on the Clyde where Emma spent the first four years of her life.

When she was in her teens, Pierson lived with her parents and three siblings in North Bradley, near Trowbridge, Wiltshire, attending Grittleton House School and then later St Laurence School in nearby Bradford on Avon where she began taking acting lessons.

After leaving school in 1997, Pierson performed in amateur productions with the North Bradley players, appearing in a number of plays including Chekhov's Uncle Vanya.

Pierson gained the role of Becky Radcliffe in the BBC children's drama series Grange Hill while studying law at the City of Bath College.

Career

After leaving Grange Hill, Pierson took on the role of Jackie Burgett in Days Like These, an ITV sitcom set in Luton and adapted from the American comedy series That '70s Show. However, Days Like These proved unsuccessful and the series was cancelled after only ten of its thirteen episodes were aired.

Pierson has continued to appear in comedy series, including various episodes of the Channel 4 sketch show Armstrong and Miller, Beast with Alexander Armstrong and The Worst Week of My Life with Ben Miller.
In 2002, following the departure from the series of Julia Sawalha, Pierson played new character student barmaid Connie in the second series of sitcom Time Gentlemen Please, written by Al Murray and Richard Herring, and appeared in an episode of the sitcom Coupling.

Pierson's roles have included comedy dramas Bedtime and Legend of the Tamworth Two. In 2010 she starred in the Radio 4 comedy series "House on Fire".

Pierson has appeared the dramas Stranded, the Hallmark channel's version of Swiss Family Robinson, BBC political drama The Project, Charles II and an as yet unreleased low-budget film, The Engagement, from the director of Sirens, John Duigan.

In 2005, Pierson played the role of policewoman Justine Hopkin in the two-part ITV drama, Bloodlines. She has since acted in other dramas, such as Riot at the Rite, a period drama about Russian dancer Nijinsky, and Hotel Babylon, a BBC series based on the book of the same name by Imogen Edwards-Jones and portraying life behind the scenes in a London hotel.

In the 2006 indie film The Lives of the Saints, Pierson played the character Tina. This was her first major film role, after lesser roles in Virtual Sexuality and Guest House Paradiso'' early in her career.

Filmography

Film

Television

Music videos

Video games

References

External links 
 

1981 births
Living people
British film actresses
British television actresses
Actresses from Plymouth, Devon
20th-century English actresses
21st-century English actresses
People educated at Bath College
People educated at Grittleton House School